United City Football Club is a Filipino professional football club based in New Clark City in Capas, Tarlac, that last competed in Philippines Football League (PFL), the top-tier league of football in the Philippines. From 2012 to 2020, the club was known as Ceres (founded as Ceres–La Salle; renamed Ceres–Negros in 2017, when it joined the PFL) and was associated with Ceres Liner, a bus company owned by Leo Rey Yanson, the club owner and chairman during that period. As Ceres, its home venue was Panaad Stadium in Bacolod, Negros Occidental.

As Ceres–La Salle, their first major success in the United Football League (UFL) was winning the UFL Division 2 title in 2014, earning them promotion to the first division. Since then, they have won the UFL FA League Cup (2014) and the UFL Division 1 title (2015). The club also won the PFF National Men's Club Championship twice (2012–13 and 2013–14). As Ceres–Negros, they won the PFL title in three consecutive seasons: 2017 through 2019, as well as the 2019 Copa Paulino Alcantara. In 2019, they completed the domestic double without a single loss.

Due to the COVID-19 pandemic, which affected Ceres Liner operations, Yanson was forced to sell the club to Emirati-Philippine sports marketing firm MMC Sportz Asia. MMC retained most of the club's players and renamed it United City F.C.

In February 2023, United City withdrew from the PFL over financial and legal issues over its deal with investor, Riau Capital Live.

History

Ceres (2012–2020)

Early years

United City was founded by Leo Rey Yanson in 2012 as Ceres–La Salle FC, with the cooperation of the University of St. La Salle of Bacolod. The club was initially composed of college and some Korean players, becoming primarily led by Philippines national team players. A notable early victory was at the inaugural Negros Men's Open Football Championships in January 2012, an 11–0 win against Bacolod United F.C. in the final.

United City's first national tournament was the 2012–13 PFF National Men's Club Championship, where they qualified for the round of 16 after sweeping their games in the Visayas regional eliminations in San Carlos. United City won the championship trophy with a 1–0 victory against Pasargad in the final. En route to the championship, they won matches against Stallion, Global and Kaya.

United Football League
After their victory in the PFF championship, Ceres expressed an intention to join the United Football League (UFL, the top-tier football league in the Philippines at that time). They were not able to play in the 2013 UFL season, however, and joined the league for the 2013 UFL Cup.

Ceres debuted in the UFL in the 2014 season in Division 2. The club dominated the division, and was promoted to Division 1 the following season. Ceres were considered serious contenders for the 2015 UFL Division 1 title in their first year, and clinched the championship with several regular-season games to play. They were unable to replicate their success in the 2016 season, and finished second.

First three seasons in the PFL

When the Philippines Football League supplanted the UFL as the Philippines' top-tier football league, Ceres was among the pioneer clubs of the 2017 inaugural season. Ceres renamed themselves the Ceres-Negros F.C., designating the Panaad Stadium in Bacolod as their home venue. Ceres-Negros won the championship in 2017, 2018 and 2019, and the 2019 Copa Paulino Alcantara title.

Issues at Vallacar Transit affected Ceres-Negros operations during the 2019 season, when the team's status was uncertain due to a Yanson family dispute about Vallacar's management. Although Ceres chairman Leo Rey Yanson lost control of Vallacar after four of his siblings staged a boardroom coup in July, he regained control of the company in August. Despite the turmoil, Ceres clinched the league title.

United City (2020–2023)
Amidst the COVID-19 pandemic and after the 2020 PFL season was postponed, rumors of Ceres–Negros' departure from the league (or disbanding) have circulated. The pandemic triggered a force majeure which terminated the contracts of all the club's players.

In July 2020, Ceres-Negros announced that club owner and chairman Leo Rey Yanson would step down and the club would negotiate with potential investors. Emirati-Philippine sports marketing firm MMC Sportz Asia was announced as the new owner of Ceres–Negros, and renamed the club United City F.C. The new owners said that the core of the original club (16 of its 21 players) would remain. MMC Sportz Asia had been involved in Philippine football as sponsors of Global F.C. in 2019, but did not renew their agreement the following season due to internal issues with the club.

United City's new management re-signed Ceres' former players, intending to retain the core of its previous owner. They include team captain Stephan Schröck, who was appointed a player-coach. They went on to clinch the title of the shortened 2020 PFL season which was held in a bubble due to the pandemic. The PFL title was their first as United City, and their fourth overall. They are also the first Filipino Club to qualify in the AFC Champions League group stage. On July 8, 2021, the club beat Beijing FC of China PR to become the first-ever Filipino club to win an AFC Champions League group stage match.

In June 2021, in a lead up to the 2021 PFL season, United City announced that it has adopted New Clark City in Capas, Tarlac as its home locality. It also has entered a partnership with the local government of Pampanga. The club with intentions to have its home stadium also announced that it would be temporarily using the New Clark City Stadium as its home venue. It also said that it would be changing its name to United Clark after the 2021 season. The name change did not happen as planned.

The club was not able to play in their home venue either for the 2021 season since most games were still held at the PFF National Training Center. They are finally set to play their first home game at the NCC Athletics Stadium on October 22, 2022 as part of the 2022–23 PFL season.

Withdrawal from the PFL
Following the conclusion of the first half of the 2022–23 PFL season, United City released its players and staff. The PFL and the PFF would confirm the withdrawal of the club from the league in February 2023. This is due to the financial issues arising from the club's deal with investor Riau Capital Live (RCL) which is based in Singapore. The RCL entered into a major agreement in United City in mid-2021 but later defaulted in October 2022. The non-fulfillment of RCL's final settlement with United City led to the withdrawal of the club while the results of a legal dispute is pending.

Crest and colors

As Ceres FC, the club crest was derived from the Ceres Liner emblem. It was encircled in green to represent the University of St. La Salle in Bacolod, which is known for its football team. The center is the oval logo of the Yanson company: Vallacar Transit, which owned the club at that time. The team wore yellow home shirts.

After the renaming of Ceres-Negros as United City F.C., a contest to design a new club crest was announced. The new crest, a circle with a football in the center, was unveiled on July 29, 2020. It was designed by Gerard Endaya, creative director of Grit Sports. Some of the crest's elements note United City's past as Ceres; its shape was carried over from its predecessor, and the two stars symbolize United City's incarnations as Ceres–La Salle and Ceres–Negros.

Kit suppliers and shirt sponsors

Stadium
United City uses the New Clark City Athletics Stadium in New Clark City, Capas, Tarlac since 2021 as their temporary home venue. They plan to build their own stadium beside Clark International Airport in the nearby province of Pampanga, their official partner local government unit. The club has previously announced plans to construct a 7,500 to 10,000-seat capacity stadium. As Ceres, the club had the Panaad Stadium in Bacolod as its home venue.

Other divisions

Youth club
United City (as Ceres–Negros) sponsored a youth club with the same name, which competed in the 7's Football League.

Esports club
UCFC Esports, serves as the esports division of United City. A joint venture with BrenPro, Inc., its formation was announced in June 2021 by the club. It intends to compete in FIFA, League of Legends: Wild Rift, Mobile Legends: Bang Bang, and Valorant competitions. UCFC Esports will compete in the 2021 Southeast Asia in the Champions eFootball (CeF), a regional eFootball (PES) tournament.

Head coaches

Honours

League
 Philippines Football League
Winners (4): 2017, 2018, 2019, 2020
 United Football League Division 1
Winners: 2015
Runners-up: 2016
 United Football League Division 2
Winners: 2014

Cups
  Copa Paulino Alcantara
 Winners: 2019, 2022
 PFF National Men's Club Championship
Winners (2): 2012–13, 2013–14
 UFL Cup
Runners-up (2): 2015, 2016
 UFL FA League Cup
Winners: 2014

Continental record

Overall record
Accurate as of February 11, 2020.

Invitational tournaments

AFC Club ranking

Records

Notes

References

External links

 
Philippines Football League clubs
Football clubs in the Philippines
2012 establishments in the Philippines
Association football clubs established in 2012
Sports in Negros Occidental